Hermissenda is a genus of sea slugs, aeolid nudibranchs, marine gastropod molluscs in the family Facelinidae.

Species
Species within the genus Hermissenda include:
 Hermissenda crassicornis (Eschscholtz, 1831)
 Hermissenda emurai (Baba, 1937)
 Hermissenda opalescens (Cooper, 1863)

References

Facelinidae